The Directorate General of Civil Defence provides civil defence and emergency services in Pakistan. The Directorate General of Civil Defence is a department of the Ministry of Interior, Government of Pakistan.

The Directorate General of Civil Defence also operates the Civil Defence Academy, Lahore and the National Institute of Fire Technology, Islamabad.

See also
 National Institute of Fire Technology
 Ministry of Interior and Narcotics Control
 Government of Pakistan

External links
 Directorate General of Civil Defense

References

Pakistan federal departments and agencies
Civil defense
Emergency management in Pakistan